Leo Meyer (March 29, 1888, in Iowa City, Iowa – September 2, 1968, in Smyrna, Delaware), was a Major League Baseball player who played shortstop for the Brooklyn Superbas in  .

After his year with the Superbas, he played several more years in the minor leagues.  His best year in the minor leagues was with the Trenton Tigers of the Tri-State League.  That year he had a .273 average 431 at bats.  He also hit four home runs that year in the "dead ball" era.  His last year in the minor leagues was with the Nashville Volunteers of the Southern Association in 1919.

External links

1888 births
1968 deaths
Major League Baseball shortstops
Brooklyn Superbas players
Baseball players from Iowa
Syracuse Stars (minor league baseball) players
Trenton Tigers players
Frederick Champs players
Hagerstown Terriers players
Chambersburg Maroons players
Cumberland Colts players
Nashville Vols players